  
Salmonby is a village in the East Lindsey district of Lincolnshire, England. Salmonby lies within the Lincolnshire Wolds, a designated Area of Outstanding Natural Beauty. Tetford  lies to the north-east and Somersby to the south.

History
An upper palaeolithic core (a piece of flint which has been repeatedly used to flake material in order to make flint tools) was found near Salmonby. The core was in good condition and has been dated at 50,000 - 10,000 years old. The area was a source of blue phosphate of iron and a great deal of iron oxide ore.

Salmonby church, dedicated to St Margaret, was a Medieval construction, largely re-built in1871. It was closed and deconsecrated in 1973, sadly demolished in 1978, with only a small wooden gate leading to the Churchyard, and a few photographs, remaining:

Community
The village has a public house, the Cross Keys Inn & Restaurant, fishing lakes, cottages and a Caravan Club CL site. There is a picnic area at a nearby sandstone cliff wall; the wall has carved reliefs of unknown origin or age.

Tetford and Salmonby Scarecrow Festival 

Tetford and Salmonby hold an annual weekend Scarecrow Festival. Villagers build scarecrows modelled on TV and film personalities, historic and contemporary figures and fictional icons, and display them outside their houses each year during May. The event raises funds for Tetford church and local charities.

References

External links 

 East Lindsey District Council website
"Salmonby", Genuki.org.uk. Retrieved 18 May 2012

Villages in Lincolnshire
East Lindsey District